Miss República Dominicana 1993 was a beauty contest held on July 28, 1992, in the Dominican Republic; the winner would represent the Dominican Republic at Miss Universe 1993. The first runner up would enter Miss World 1993. The second runner up would enter in Reina Mundial del Banano 1993. 26 candidates representing provinces and municipalities entered. The rest of finalist entered different pageants.

Results

Delegates

Miss Dominican Republic
1993 beauty pageants
1993 in the Dominican Republic